Agononida andrewi is a species of squat lobster in the family Munididae. The species is named after Andrew I. L. Payne, a marine scientist.

References

Squat lobsters
Crustaceans described in 1994